Kaulahea may refer to:
 Kaulahea I, 10th Moi of Maui
 Kaulahea II, 22nd Moi of Maui
 Kaulahea Kaohelalani Wilcox, Hawaiian prince, son of Orson Kiha-a-Piilani Wilcox